One Caribbean Media Ltd (OCM) is a vertically integrated holding company based in Port of Spain, Trinidad and Tobago. The new company was founded in December 2005, following the merger of the Caribbean Communications Network (CCN) of Trinidad and Tobago, and the Nation Corporation of Barbados. The merger of the respective conglomerates was pursued after both companies held a sizable financial stake in each other for a number of years.

The company still currently holds a large financial stake in both the Jamaica Observer, Jamaica's daily newspaper, as well as Guyana's Stabroek News.

Prize
Since 2011, the company has sponsored the annual OCM Bocas Prize for Caribbean Literature.

Subsidiaries

The Caribbean Communications Network (CCN) Group (Trinidad and Tobago)

Newspaper
 The Trinidad Express Newspaper

Television
 CCN TV6
 Grenada Broadcasting Network (60%)
 GBN Television

Radio
 One Caribbean Media (60%)
 Klassic Radio
 Sun FM
Hott 93

ISPs
 GreenDot Group

New Media
 Internet Express
 CCN TV6

The Nation Corporation Group (Barbados)

Newspapers
 The Nation Newspaper

Radio
 Starcom Network Inc.
 HOTT 95.3 FM
 Voice of Barbados (790 VOB)
 104 Radio
 Life 97.5 FM

New Media
One Caribbean Media
 NationNews
 Hott 95.3FM
 VOB
 Love FM
 Life FM

CCCL
 Hott 93.5FM (Trinidad)
 The Wave 93.7/94.5FM (St. Lucia)
 The Caribbean Super Station (CSS) (Antigua, Barbuda, British Virgin Islands, Grenada, Montserrat, St. Lucia, St. Kitts, Nevis and Trinidad)

Citadel Group
 i95.5 FM TT
 RED 96.7FM
 Hitz107.1FM

References

External links
One Caribbean Media website

Mass media companies of Trinidad and Tobago
Mass media in Barbados
Mass media in Trinidad and Tobago
Holding companies established in 2005
Mass media companies established in 2005
2005 establishments in Trinidad and Tobago